Bobby Houston (born 1952) is a Scottish former footballer, who played for  Partick Thistle, Kilmarnock and Greenock Morton.

References

External links 

1952 births
Living people
Footballers from Glasgow
Scottish footballers
Scottish Football League players
Partick Thistle F.C. players
Kilmarnock F.C. players
Greenock Morton F.C. players
Scottish Football League representative players
Association football wingers
Association football fullbacks
Rutherglen Glencairn F.C. players